The Australian National Surfing Museum, located in Torquay, Victoria, is widely cited as hosting the world's largest surfing and beach culture museum.  It is said to be one of "the most significant centres of world surfing heritage" by the International Surfing Association.

References

External links
 Government website
 Government Community Building
 

Museums in Victoria (Australia)
History museums in Australia
Surf lifesaving
Surfing in Australia
Surfing museums
Sports museums in Australia